Dig Your Roots is the third studio album by American country music duo Florida Georgia Line. The album was released on August 26, 2016, by Big Machine and Big Loud Mountain. As with their first two albums, it is produced by Joey Moi. The two performers were originally known for their upbeat and cross mix of genres within their music but they claimed this album was their "calm down" album. They claimed they are looking to do more than just entertain with this album but to get people to dig deep into what is really important in their lives.

Singles 
The album's lead single "H.O.L.Y.", was released on April 29, 2016, and became a huge commercial success, topping the Hot Country Songs chart for eighteen consecutive weeks, and also reached number one on the Country Airplay chart. It also peaked at number 14 on the Billboard Hot 100 chart.

"May We All", a duet with Tim McGraw, is the album's second single, and was released on July 15, 2016. It reached number one on the Country Airplay chart, and number two on Hot Country Songs. It also peaked at number 30 on the Hot 100 chart.

"God, Your Mama, and Me", a duet with the Backstreet Boys, is the album's third single, and was released on January 23, 2017. It peaked at number one on the Country Airplay chart. It also peaked at number 46 on the Hot 100.

"Smooth" was the album's fourth and final single, and was released on August 13, 2017. Although, it peaked at number 89 on the Hot 100, it failed to reach the top 10 on either Country chart.

Critical reception

Billy Dukes, writing for Taste of Country, juxtaposed the album to the band's first two albums, praising the diversity of the songs. He wrote that "The evolution of Florida Georgia Line is fascinating. Had they tried to repeat the formula that made them headliners, they wouldn't have made it to album three. Kelley and Hubbard deserve credit for staying one step ahead of their fans and expectations. Annie Reuter of Sounds Like Nashville also reviewed the album favorably, similarly praising the album's diversity, as well as the more mature themes, writing that "Florida Georgia Line showcase their maturity throughout Dig Your Roots but they never waver from what fans know and love about them. The party anthems and beach hangs remain, but so does their respect for their wives and their hopes to continue building a strong family. On Dig Your Roots, Hubbard and Kelley maintain the fun but also show a surprising depth that is more than welcomed."

Commercial performance
Dig Your Roots debuted at number two on the US Billboard 200 chart with 145,000 units, of which 126,000 were pure album sales in its first week of release. In its second week, the album fell to number five on the Billboard 200 chart while moving an additional 42,000 units. The album has sold 444,300 copies as of February 2018. On August 7, 2017, the album was certified platinum by the Recording Industry Association of America (RIAA) for combined sales and album-equivalent units of over a million units in the United States.

In Australia, the album debuted at number seven, becoming Florida Georgia Line's first top ten album in the country.

Track listing

Personnel
Performers and musicians
Brian Kelley – lead vocals, background vocals 
Tyler Hubbard – lead vocals, background vocals 
Ziggy Marley – featured artist , background vocals 
Tim McGraw – featured artist 
Backstreet Boys – featured artists , background vocals 
Big Loud Choir – background vocals 
Sarah Buxton – background vocals 
Dave Cohen – keyboards 
Charlie Judge – keyboards 
Jimmie Lee Sloas – bass guitars
Joey Moi – background vocals , percussion , electric guitars 
Jamie Moore – keyboards 
Russ Pahl – pedal steel guitar 
Ilya Toshinsky – acoustic guitars, electric guitars , dobro , mandolin , banjo 
Nir Z – drums , percussion 

Production
Scott Cooke – digital editing
Zach Crowell – programming 
Jesse Frasure – programming 
Mike Gaydusek – assistant engineering 
Scott Johnson – production assisting
Andrew Mendelson – mastering
Joey Moi – production, programming , recording, mixing
Jamie Moore – programming 
Eivind Nordland – engineering
Jordan Schmidt – programming 

Design
Gina Ketchum – hair, make up, wardrobe
Lloyd Aur Norman – art direction, design
Ryan Smith – photography

Charts

Weekly charts

Year-end charts

Certifications

References 

2016 albums
Florida Georgia Line albums
Republic Records albums
Albums produced by Joey Moi